Robert Andrew Wauch (1786, Edinburgh, Scotland – 1866), Wauch emigrated to Australia in 1836, at the age of 50, where the town of Wauchope, New South Wales, was named after him.

Robert Wauch is sometimes referred to as Robert Wauchope. The confusion occurred because of a family dispute. When his paternal grandfather died, his heirs disputed the division of the family estate in Edinburgh, ending in a legal battle. After the court case, Robert Wauchope, Robert Wauch's father, dropped the "ope" from his name and retired to his property named Foxall.

Like his father, Wauch joined the armed services. He retired from service in 28th Regiment of Foot in 1836 and sailed to Sydney, Australia, with his wife and three children. They settled on a  property at King Creek in the Hastings Valley. In the next four years he added  to his property and built Wauch House.

Robert Wauch died in the Macleay area in 1866, and the Government Gazette published the deeds of his properties, specifying that they should be called Wauchope. When the post office opened in a nearby settlement in 1881, it was named Wauchope, although the Government Gazette misprinted the name Wanghope, an error that was not corrected for until 1889.

References

1786 births
1866 deaths
Military personnel from Edinburgh
Australian people of Scottish descent
28th Regiment of Foot officers